Belinda O'Hooley (born 18 July 1971) is a singer-songwriter and pianist from Yorkshire, England.  Formerly a member of Rachel Unthank and the Winterset (now The Unthanks), she now records and performs as O'Hooley & Tidow with her wife Heidi Tidow (pronounced Tee-doe).

Early life and education
O'Hooley, who has Irish roots, was born in Horsforth, Leeds, grew up in Guiseley and went to school in Menston. She studied behavioural sciences at the University of Huddersfield.

Professional career
O'Hooley comes from a long line of County Sligo musicians and performed alongside her first cousin Tommy Fleming, a singer who was formerly with De Danann.

Rachel Unthank and the Winterset
From 2004 until 2008 she was a member of Rachel Unthank and the Winterset (now The Unthanks). Nic Oliver, reviewing their 2007 album The Bairns for musicOMH, described O'Hooley as "the ace in the pack throughout The Bairns. Her background in cabaret (intriguingly, she had once appeared on Stars In Their Eyes impersonating Annie Lennox) adds a left-field edge to the music, with her jazzy piano chords lending a sing-along feel to the live favourite Blue's Gaen Oot O'The Fashion. O'Hooley also contributes the two original tracks to the album, although the casual listener could quite easily mistake both Blackbird and Whitehorn for traditional songs".

Solo albums
In 2005 O'Hooley released a solo album, Music is My Silence, described by reviewer David Kidman of Netrhythms.co.uk as "a commanding and defiant set of thoroughly contemporary-sounding songs" and by FATEA as "a highly polished collection of songs that gently sway between folk and jazz".

In 2019 she released a second solo album, Inversions, described by Jude Rogers in The Guardian as "a set of beautiful piano and spoken-word pieces".

O'Hooley & Tidow

She has issued eight albums with Heidi Tidow, performing as O'Hooley & Tidow. Their 2016 album, Shadows, was given a five-starred review by Robin Denselow in The Guardian and four of their other albums have received four-starred reviews in the British national press.

Coven
With Heidi Tidow she performs in the all-female group Coven, whose members also include Hannah James, Rowan Rheingans, Hazel Askew and Grace Petrie. In 2017, Coven released an EP, Unholy Choir.

Other musical contributions
O'Hooley played piano on Jackie Oates' albums Jackie Oates (2006), The Violet Hour (2008), Hyperboreans (2009), Saturnine (2011) and Lullabies (2013). With Heidi Tidow, she was also featured on Chumbawamba's album ABCDEFG (2010) and DVD Going, Going (2012), Lucy Ward's debut album Adelphi Has to Fly (2011) and Patsy Matheson's Domino Girls (2014).

O'Hooley & Tidow were amongst the musicians on the album The Ballads of Child Migration: Songs for Britain's Child Migrants, released by Delphonic Records in October 2015. They contributed the music for one song on the album, "Why Did I Leave Thee?" 	

O'Hooley also accompanied Nic Jones at London's Queen Elizabeth Hall on his 2011 comeback tour and on further tours in 2012 and 2013. In 2015 O'Hooley accompanied Jim Boyes on his Sensations of a Wound tour, telling a little-known story of the First World War. An album of this music, Sensations of a Wound: The Long, Long Trail of Robert Riby Boyes,  was released on the No Masters label in February 2015.

She appeared on Ray Hearne's album Umpteen in 2016.

Other work
She had a small acting role as a plain-clothes police inspector in episode 1 of season 3 of  Happy Valley, the TV programme created by Sally Wainwright who was also created the TV series Gentleman Jack.

Discography

with Rachel Unthank and the Winterset

Belinda O'Hooley

O'Hooley and Tidow
Belinda O'Hooley's recordings with Heidi Tidow are listed at O'Hooley & Tidow.

with Coven

Personal life
Belinda O'Hooley and her wife Heidi Tidow, who married in 2016, live in Golcar in West Yorkshire. They have a son, Flynn, born in September 2019.

Notes

References

External links
 Official website: O'Hooley & Tidow

1971 births
Living people
20th-century LGBT people
21st-century British pianists
21st-century English women musicians
21st-century English women singers
21st-century LGBT people
21st-century women pianists
Alumni of the University of Huddersfield
Composers for piano
English women singer-songwriters
English folk musicians
English people of Irish descent
English women pianists
English lesbian musicians
English LGBT songwriters
English LGBT singers
Folk pianists
Lesbian songwriters
Lesbian singers
Musicians from Leeds
People from Golcar
People from Guiseley
People from Horsforth